The Tbilisi Appeal Court is the second instance court in the Common Courts System of Georgia. The Court discusses appeals on the judgments of the first instance courts, and its jurisdiction covers eastern Georgia.

History 
The Tbilisi Appeal court was established on 1 November 2005, after the previously-operating Tbilisi Regional Court was abolished.

Structure 
The Tbilisi Appeal Court is managed by its Chairman. The present Chairman Valeri Tsertsvadze (ვალერი ცერცვაძე).
The Court consists of 3 chambers and 1 board:
 Chamber for Civil Cases
 Chamber for Administrative Cases
 Chamber for Criminal Cases
 Investigatory Board
The Tbilisi Appeal Court's staff is overseen by a Court Manager. The structure of the Court's staff, which currently numbers 201:
 Chairman's Bureau
 Division for Human Resources and Management Matters
 Chancellery and Court Reception
 Division for Material Maintenance and Court's Bailiff
The Appeal Court's staff consists of jurists, translators, couriers, drivers, and IT specialists.

Court Reform 
The Tbilisi Appeal Court has established many projects for court petitioners. Reform efforts are ongoing.

References

External links 
Tbilisi Appeal Court's Official Web-Site
Case Management Program (CMP)

Law of Georgia (country)